Thomas Leon Keller (born 5 August 1999) is a German footballer who plays as a centre-back for  club 1. FC Heidenheim.

Career
Keller made his professional debut for FC Ingolstadt in the 3. Liga on 22 July 2019, starting in the away match against Carl Zeiss Jena which finished as a 2–1 win.

On 27 April 2022, Keller signed a three-year contract with 1. FC Heidenheim, effective from 1 July 2022.

References

External links
 Profile at DFB.de
 Profile at kicker.de

1999 births
Living people
Footballers from Munich
German footballers
Association football central defenders
FC Ingolstadt 04 II players
FC Ingolstadt 04 players
1. FC Heidenheim players
3. Liga players
Regionalliga players
2. Bundesliga players